The whistling thrushes comprise a genus Myophonus (Myiophoneus) of the Old World flycatcher family Muscicapidae.

They are all medium-sized mostly insectivorous or omnivorous birds. They are all brightly coloured species found in India and southeast Asia. The male is usually blue, and the females are either similar to the male or brown. The brighter blue patches found on the shoulders and sometimes the head, of whistling thrushes, uniquely for a passerine, reflect strongly in the ultraviolet.

Taxonomy
As the English name suggests, the genus was at one time placed in the thrush family Turdidae but in 2010 two separate molecular phylogenetic studies found that members of the genus were more closely related to species in the Old World flycatcher family Muscicapidae.

The genus includes nine species several of which have ranges that are restricted to islands or peninsulas:

Javan, Bornean and brown-winged were formerly lumped as the Sunda whistling thrush, but were split in 2004.

Habits

Whistling thrushes are mostly seen in hilly areas except during winter when they may descend to streams near the plains. They specialize in feeding on snails and their strong hooked bills are used to deal with them. They may choose a particular rock on which they crack the shells.

The nests are usually in crevices of rocks and boulders close to water. The cup nests have moss and twigs and is lined with roots and leaves. The eggs are usually three and sometimes four, elongate with a gray ground colour and marked with speckles.

References

Further reading

Thrushes by Clement and Hathaway, 

Myophonus